The Continental C115, C125 and C140 aircraft engines were made by Continental Motors in the 1940s, all sharing the US military designation O-280. Of flat-6 configuration, the engines produced 115 hp (86 kW) 125 hp (93 kW) or 140 hp (104 kW) respectively.

The C115 was in production from 1945 to 1951, the C125 was in production from 1945 to 1952, and the C140 from 1945 to 1946.

The C125 has the same crankcase as the Continental C145, although the engines differ in stroke, compression ratio and carburetor jetting. The C125 features a cast iron camshaft and hydraulic tappets.

Applications

C125
 Aero-Flight Streak
 Baumann Brigadier
 Call-Air A-3
 Globe Swift
 Grumman Tadpole
 Hockaday Comet
 SAI KZ VII
 Meyers MAC 125
 Miles Gemini

Specifications (C125)
Reference: Engines for Homebuilt Aircraft & Ultralights

See also

References

 Gunston, Bill. (1986) World Encyclopedia of Aero Engines. Patrick Stephens: Wellingborough.
 Erickson, Jack. Horizontally-Opposed Aero Engines

Boxer engines
1940s aircraft piston engines
O-280